Pseudorimula midatlantica is a species of sea snail, a marine gastropod mollusk in the family Lepetodrilidae.

Distribution
This species occurs in hydrothermal vents and seeps in the Snake Pit hydrothermal field, Mid-Atlantic Ridge.

Description 
The maximum recorded shell length is 8.1 mm.

Habitat 
Minimum recorded depth is 1622 m. Maximum recorded depth is 3520 m.

References

 Warén, A. & Bouchet, P. (2001) Gastropoda and Monoplacophora from hydrothermal vents and seeps; new taxa and records. The Veliger, 44, 116–231

External links

Lepetodrilidae
Gastropods described in 1992